Billy Power may refer to:
 Billy Power (footballer)
 Billy Power (hurler)

See also
 William Power (disambiguation)